Snow Peak  or snowpeak may refer to:

Places
 the English name for Piton des Neiges, a volcano on Réunion
 Snow Peak (Alberta), Canada; a mountain
 Snow Peak (Antarctica); a mountain
 Snow Peak Wildlife Management Area, Idaho, USA
 Snow Peak (Oregon), a summit in the Cascade Range southwest of Salem and east of Lebanon

Other uses
 A snow field capped mountain
 Snow cornice
  a Japanese company that sells lightweight hiking and camping equipment

See also

 
 
 Snow Mountain
 Mount Snow
 Glacial maximum
 Icepeak (disambiguation)
 Snow cap (disambiguation)
 Snow (disambiguation)
 Peak (disambiguation)